The men's 50 kilometres race walk at the 1954 European Athletics Championships was held in Bern, Switzerland, on 27 August 1954.

Medalists

Results

Final
27 August

Participation
According to an unofficial count, 21 athletes from 13 countries participated in the event.

 (1)
 (1)
 (1)
 (1)
 (2)
 (2)
 (2)
 (2)
 (1)
 (2)
 (2)
 (2)
 (2)

References

50 kilometres race walk
Racewalking at the European Athletics Championships